The Renewal of the Republic of Poland is a conservative political association in Poland. It was formed on 3 September 2021 by former Agreement MPs that decided to continue their support of Law and Justice government after the remainder of the party went into opposition. The leader of the group is Marcin Ociepa.

Deputies
All deputies were elected on the United Right list, and all are former members of Agreement.

 Marcin Ociepa: leader of the group.
 Andrzej Gut-Mostowy
 Wojciech Murdzek
 Grzegorz Piechowiak
 Anna Dąbrowska-Banaszek

Ideology
The group has been referred to as a pro-European "deputy ministers union" due to their apparent lack of political ideology and the fact that all but one of their MPs are deputy ministers in the current government. The association is supposed to unveil their political program in the middle of November. Ociepa stated that "the main five priorities of the party are security, economy, self-government, European policy and health policy, with a special opening to the young generation".

References

External links
Twitter account

2021 establishments in Poland
Political parties established in 2021